Einar Olav Skogholt (born 18 December 1947 in Nord-Odal) is a Norwegian politician for the Labour Party.

He was elected to the Norwegian Parliament from Hedmark in 1989, and was re-elected on two occasions. He had previously served as deputy representative during the terms 1977–1981 and 1985–1989.

Skogholt was mayor of Nord-Odal in 1972–1975 and 1975–1977, and a member of Hedmark county council in 1988–1989. He chaired the county party chapter from 1990 to 1998.

References

1947 births
Living people
People from Nord-Odal
Members of the Storting
Labour Party (Norway) politicians
Mayors of places in Hedmark
21st-century Norwegian politicians
20th-century Norwegian politicians